The World Science Forum (WSF) is an international conference series on global science policy. Since 2003, it is organised biannually in Budapest, Hungary.

The WSF traces back its origin to the first World Conference on Science, organised by UNESCO and ICSU and held in Budapest in 1999. The first WSF was organised in 2003, followed by the second in 2005 and the third in 2007. The fourth WSF was held from 5 through 7 November 2009 in Budapest, Hungary, focusing on "Knowledge and future". The fifth World Science Forum was held between 17 and 19 November 2011 in Budapest, it focused on "The changing landscape of science". The fifth World Science forum is held between 20 and 23 November on the topic of "Ethics and Responsibility".

The World Science Forum aims at being the "Davos of Science" and achieving the same global strategic impact on science and science policy as the World Economic Forum does in the field of global economic policy.

Origin, vision and mission 
By the end of the 20th century, science and knowledge became essential parts of Mankind's everyday lives. Scientific knowledge is not only the result of Humanity's inherent curiosity and scientific endeavor, it is a powerful means of understanding human nature, society, and the Nature in which humans live. Advance in science is a major contributor to society's socio-economic development, the global welfare of humankind, man's relation to Nature, and the quality of life.

In past centuries the predominant role of science was the production of new knowledge to satisfy the curiosity of the human mind. In recent years, the role of science has undergone changes, as scientific inquiry has increasingly become the motor of development in society. By the end of the 20th century, science had taken on a number of new roles. These novel roles may – and should – contribute in a decisive manner to the daily life of humankind in the 21st century.

In spite of its spectacular development and new opportunities, the science of 21st century faces wavering confidence, unseen dilemmas and new questions. These problems can be solved only if the main procedures and users of knowledge are able to reach common ground for the new roles of knowledge and science in 21st century's global society.

These issues were discussed at the World Conference on Science from 26 June to 1 July 1999 in Budapest, Hungary. The conference was organised by UNESCO and the International Council for Science (ICSU), with the participation of over 2000 delegates from 186 countries.

As a follow-up to the World Conference on Science, the Hungarian Academy of Sciences (HAS), in partnership with UNESCO and ICSU, initiated a unique forum series for a much needed genuine debate and hopefully lasting interaction between the scientific community and society. Three members of HAS played a key role in establishing the World Science Forum series: István Láng, the organiser of the 1999 World Conference of Science; Balázs Gulyás, the founding director of the WSF series; and E. Sylvester Vizi, the then president of HAS. At present the President of World Science Forum is Professor Tamas Freund, President of the Hungarian Academy of Sciences.

Mission of WSF

– To provide major stakeholders with a global forum for dialogue on science and its role and responsibility in the 21st Century.

– To better understand and promote the need for science and scientific advice in political and economic decision-making.

– To exchange views and ideas on how to communicate science and its basic values to the society at large and to the various stakeholder groups.

Organisers 

The main organising institution of the WSF is the Hungarian Academy of Sciences, in close partnership with UNESCO and ICSU. The preparatory activities of the Forum are led by a Governing Board, helped by an international Steering Committee.

Patrons 

Patrons of the WSF are the President of Hungary, the Director-General of UNESCO, the President of ICSU, and the President of the European Commission. At present, they are Pál Schmitt, Irina Bokova, Yuan Tseh Lee and José Manuel Barroso.

International Steering Committee 

The Steering Committee of the WSF consists of internationally renowned scientists and science politicians. Its chair is József Pálinkás, president of the Hungarian Academy of Sciences. Members of the steering committee include Sir Brian Heap, chairman EASAC; Gretchen Kalonji, assistant director-general for Natural Sciences, United Nations Educational Scientific and Cultural Organization (UNESCO); Yuan-Tseh Lee, president, International Council for Science (ICSU), Nobel Laureate; Alan I. Leshner, chief executive officer, American Association for the Advancement of Science (AAAS); Connie Nshemereirwe, co-chair of the Global Young Academy; Jacob Palis, president, Brazilian Academy of Sciences, president, The Academy of Sciences for the Developing World (TWAS); Werner Arber, Nobel Laureate; Ahmed Zewail, director, Physical Biology Center for Ultrafast Science and Technology, Nobel Laureate; Ichiro Kanazawa, president, Science Council of Japan; Sir George Radda, chairman, Biomedical Research Council; Lidia Brito, director, Division for Science Policy and Sustainable Development, Natural Sciences Sector, UNESCO; Deliang Chen, executive director, International Council for Science (ICSU); Vaughan Turekian, American Association for the Advancement of Science (AAAS).

Governing bodies 

The chairman of the Governing Board of WSF is József Pálinkás, president of the Hungarian Academy of Sciences and president of World Science Forum. The executive director of the WSF is Balazs Gulyas, the executive secretaries are Gergely Böhm and Ádám Kégler.

References

External links 

Homepage

Science events